Pop Airplay (also called  Mainstream Top 40, Pop Songs, and Top 40/CHR) is a 40-song music chart published weekly by Billboard Magazine that ranks the most popular songs of pop music being played on a panel of Top 40 radio stations in the United States. The rankings are based on radio airplay detections as measured by Nielsen Broadcast Data Systems (Nielsen BDS), a subsidiary of the U.S.' leading marketing research company. Consumer researchers, Nielsen Audio (formerly Arbitron), refers to the format as contemporary hit radio (CHR).
The current number-one song as of the chart dated March 18, 2023 is "Flowers" by Miley Cyrus.

History
The chart debuted in Billboard Magazine in its issued date October 3, 1992, with the introduction of two Top 40 airplay charts, Mainstream and Rhythm-Crossover. Both Top 40 charts measured "actual monitored airplay" from data compiled by Broadcast Data Systems (BDS). The Top 40/Mainstream chart was compiled from airplay on radio stations playing a wide variety of music, while the Top 40/Rhythm-Crossover chart was made up from airplay on stations playing more dance and R&B music. Both charts were "born of then-new BDS electronic monitoring technology" as a more objective and precise way of measuring airplay on radio stations. This data was also used as the airplay component for Hot 100 tabulations. American Top 40 with Shadoe Stevens used this chart for their show from January 1993 to January 1995.

Top 40/Mainstream was published in the print edition of Billboard from its debut in October 1992 through May 1995, when both Top 40 charts were moved exclusively to Airplay Monitor, a secondary chart publication by Billboard. They returned to the print edition in the August 2, 2003, issue. The first number-one song on the chart was "End of the Road" by Boyz II Men.

Chart criteria 
There are forty positions on this chart. Songs are ranked based on its total number of spins per week. This is calculated by electronically monitoring Mainstream Top 40 radio stations across the U.S. 24 hours a day, seven days a week by Nielsen Broadcast Data Systems.

Songs receiving the greatest growth receive a "bullet", although there are tracks that also get bullets if the loss in detections doesn't exceed the percentage of downtime from a monitored station. "Airpower" awards are issued to songs that appear on the top 20 of both the airplay and audience chart for the first time, while the "greatest gainer" award is given to song with the largest increase in detections. A song with six or more spins in its first week is awarded an "airplay add". If two songs are tied in spins in the same week, the one with the biggest increase that week ranks higher.

Since the introduction of the chart until 2005, songs below No. 20 were moved to recurrent after 26 weeks on the chart. Beginning the chart week of December 3, 2005, songs below No. 20 were moved to recurrent after 20 weeks on the chart. Since the chart dated December 4, 2010, songs below No. 15 are moved to recurrent after 20 weeks on the chart

Whereas the Pop Airplay and Pop 100 Airplay charts both measured the airplay of songs played on Mainstream stations playing pop-oriented music, the Pop 100 Airplay (like the Hot 100 Airplay) measured airplay based on statistical impressions, while the Top 40 Mainstream chart used the number of total detections.

Source:

All-time achievements
In 2012, for the 20th anniversary of the chart, Billboard compiled a ranking of the 100 best-performing songs on the chart over the 20 years, along with the best-performing artists. "Iris" by Goo Goo Dolls ranked as the #1 song on that list. In 2017, Billboard revised the rankings, including the methodologies for how they are calculated. "Another Night" by Real McCoy was the new #1 song, while the previous #1 song, "Iris", dropped to #8. Rihanna ranked as the top artist on both all-time charts. Shown below are the top 10 songs and the top 10 artists from the most recent chart.

Top 10 Pop Songs of all time (1992–2017)

Source:

Top 10 Pop Songs artists of all time (1992–2017)

Source:

Song records

Highest debut

Most weeks at number one

Most weeks in the top 10

Most weeks on the chart

*Year when the songs ended their respective chart runs.

Prior to 2018, the song with the most weeks on the chart was "I'll Be" by Edwin McCain, which spent 41 weeks on the chart in 1998. This record run held for almost two decades, but has been surpassed many times since then. Radio stations having more data points, such as streaming, to increase their accuracy at measuring what radio listeners want to hear, have made longer runs more commonplace.

Longest climbs to number one

Longest climbs to the top 10

Artist records

Artists with the most number-one singles

Artists with the most cumulative weeks at number one

Artists with the most top 10 singles

Artists with the most entries

Simultaneously occupying the top two positions
 Mariah Carey: December 9, 1995
 "One Sweet Day" (with Boyz II Men)
 "Fantasy"

 OutKast: January 31 - February 7, 2004
 "Hey Ya!" 
 "The Way You Move" (featuring Sleepy Brown)

 Pharrell Williams: July 27 - August 3, 2013
 "Blurred Lines" (Robin Thicke featuring T.I. and Pharrell)
 "Get Lucky" (Daft Punk featuring Pharrell Williams)

Iggy Azalea: June 28 - July 12, 2014
 "Fancy" (featuring Charli XCX)
 "Problem" (Ariana Grande featuring Iggy Azalea)

Halsey: February 23 - March 9, 2019
 "Without Me"
 "Eastside" (with Benny Blanco and Khalid)

Ariana Grande: February 20, 2021
 "34+35"
 "Positions"

Olivia Rodrigo: August 7–28, 2021
 "Good 4 U"
 "Deja Vu"

Doja Cat: October 15–22, 2022
 "I Like You (A Happier Song)" (Post Malone featuring Doja Cat)
 "Vegas"

Source:

Simultaneously three or more songs in the top 10

 Ariana Grande: May 15–22, 2021
 "Positions"
 "34+35"
 "POV"
 Doja Cat: October 23–30, 2021
 "Kiss Me More"
 "You Right"
 "Need to Know"
 Harry Styles: October 15–29, 2022
 "As It Was"
 "Late Night Talking"
 "Music for a Sushi Restaurant"

Source:

Self-replacement at number one
Mariah Carey — "Fantasy" → "One Sweet Day" (Mariah Carey and Boyz II Men) (December 9, 1995)
OutKast — "Hey Ya!" → "The Way You Move" (OutKast featuring Sleepy Brown) (February 14, 2004)
Iggy Azalea — "Fancy" (Iggy Azalea featuring Charli XCX) → "Problem" (Ariana Grande featuring Iggy Azalea) (July 12, 2014) †
Halsey — "Without Me" → "Eastside" (Benny Blanco, Halsey and Khalid) (March 2, 2019)
Ariana Grande — "Positions" → "34+35" (February 13, 2021) ††
Doja Cat — "I Like You (A Happier Song)" (Post Malone featuring Doja Cat) → "Vegas" (October 22, 2022)

† Iggy Azalea is the only act in Mainstream Top 40 history to replace herself at number one with her first two chart entries.

†† Ariana Grande became the first artist to succeed herself at number one as the only act credited on both tracks.

Source:

Additional artist achievements

Lady Gaga is the only artist to have her first six singles reach No. 1.
Britney Spears holds the record for the longest span between No. 1s at 12 years, seven months and four days between her first No.1 and her latest.
JoJo became the youngest (13) solo artist to have a number-one single on the chart with "Leave (Get Out)".
Rihanna is the youngest (22) artist to attain at least seven No. 1 singles on the chart.
Justin Bieber became the youngest (26) male artist to attain at least seven No. 1 singles on the chart with "Intentions" (featuring Quavo).
Kate Bush broke the record for the oldest song to have ever charted on the Mainstream Top 40 chart with "Running Up That Hill", originally released in 1985. It charted in 2022 after its use in the fourth season of Stranger Things. The previous record holder was Empire of the Sun, whose song "Walking on a Dream", originally released in 2008, charted in 2016 after its use in a Honda commercial.

Album records

Most number-one singles from an album

References

External links
Pop Airplay on Billboard.com

Billboard charts
Pop music